On November 4, 1986, the District of Columbia held an election for its non-voting House delegate representing the District of Columbia's at-large congressional district. The winner of the race was Walter E. Fauntroy (D), who won his eighth re-election. All elected members would serve in 100th United States Congress.

The delegate is elected for two-year terms.

Candidates 
Walter E. Fauntroy, a Democrat, sought re-election for his ninth term to the United States House of Representatives. Fauntroy was opposed in this election by Republican challenger Mary King and D.C. Statehood Party candidate Julie McCall, who received 13.91% and 4.83%, respectively.  This resulted in Fauntroy being elected with 80.09% of the vote.

Results

See also
 United States House of Representatives elections in the District of Columbia

References 

United States House 
District of Columbia
1986